The Philippine Council for Agriculture, Aquatic, and Natural Resources Research and Development (PCAARRD) is a council of the Department of Science and Technology of the Philippines government.

The council aims to help national research and development efforts in agriculture, forestry, and natural resources of the Philippines. It does so by assisting with planning strategies, formulating policies, and programs for development. It is the body responsible nationally for programming and allocating government and external funds for R&D, and monitors and evaluates these programs for effectiveness.

References

Department of Science and Technology (Philippines)